"The Special Relationship" is an episode of the BBC sitcom, The Green Green Grass. It was first screened on 30 December 2007, as the 2007 Christmas special.

Synopsis

Whilst out in the fields, Boycie and Marlene are horrified when Earl digs up an unexploded hand grenade, and after throwing it as far away as possible, they take cover behind the nearest tractor – only for Earl to bring it back to them. A further search reveals that there are many old military relics in the fields, and Boycie decides to transform one of his barns into a military museum. Tyler and Bethany play a prank on Boycie by pretending to stage several interviews with international newspapers, but he catches them in the act. It turns out, however, that one of the calls he received was a genuine call from a local Peckham newspaper.

Shortly after, an article in the Peckham Times about Boycie's discovery catches the eye of one Cliff Cooper (George Wendt) a billionaire American CEO from Los Angeles. Cliff then drives up to visit Oakam, and turns up unexpectedly at The Grange. He reveals that The Grange was used as an officer's barracks for an overseas US Army base near the village, and he was billeted there in the 1970s as a young army officer. Boycie and Marlene are quick to invite him to their home as a guest, and at the local pub, Cliff reminisces fondly about his posting at the village, sharing banter with Elgin (an old friend) about 'Cloud Day' – a covered-up incident in which a nuclear device stored at the local village leaked a cloud of steam through the village, and it soon emerges that Cliff was a lady's man, having had more than a few flings with the local women during his posting (although an angry Llewellyn storms that the American soldiers had an unfair advantage over the loval men because of their money, smart clothes, aftershave and regular bathing). Cliff mentions that a colleague had mentioned to him that he might well have had offspring in the village from one of his girlfriends, and it soon emerges that the girl he remembers most fondly is Mrs. Cakeworthy's mother. After checking Mrs. Cakeworthy's details in the old Landlord's files, the date reveals that her birthday was around nine months after Cliff's posting ended, and when she mentions that she never knew her father, and that her mother always talked about him being a US Army officer, they begin to suspect that she might be his daughter. He and Boycie conspire to get a DNA sample from Mrs. Cakeworthy's tea cup, and after running tests on the cup Boycie took, the results come back positive. Cliff gleefully proclaims himself to be Mrs. Cakeworthy's long-lost father, and the two are delighted.

Deciding to bring her with him to the States, Cliff and Mrs. Cakeworthy are preparing to leave, when it is noticed on her passport that the birth-date is almost a year prior to the one in the files, and she admits that she lied about her age to get a job with the old Squire, and she was actually born a year before Cliff came to the UK, and Marlene reveals that the cup Boycie took for DNA testing was actually Cliff's. On the other side of the farm, Jed reveals while on the phone to the bank that his mother was, in fact, Aurora, another of Cliff's flings, and suggesting that he is Cliff's son. As a saddened Cliff is leaving the farm, deciding that he will have to return to the United States without knowing who he is the father of, he and Jed make eye contact, and both men realise the truth. Meanwhile, a miserable Mrs. Cakeworthy is commenting about how her mother had mentioned her father having been an American Army Captain, and Elgin (who had borrowed a Captain's uniform to have a better chance with the ladies) is worried upon realising that he might be her father.

Episode cast

References

British TV Comedy Guide for The Green Green Grass
BARB viewing figures

2007 British television episodes
The Green Green Grass episodes